For You is the fifth studio album by English recording artist Frankmusik. The album was released digitally on 9 October 2015 and streamed via Spotify

The album is preceded by the release of the promotional single "This", which along its music video was premiered on May 4, 2015. The music video for the official lead single "I Remember", directed by Danny Land, was revealed the same day the album came out.

Track listing
All songs written and produced by Frankmusik.

References

Frankmusik albums
2015 albums